Central High School was a public high school in the Central neighborhood of Cleveland, Ohio. It was established in 1846 and merged with East Tech in 1952. It had several locations during its existence. The school served white and African American students.

History

It was the first high school in Cleveland and the first free public high school west of the Alleghenies. 
The school began in a Universalist church basement. After Ohio City was annexed to Cleveland, West High School was established as a division of the school since state law allowed only one public high school in Cleveland.

Notable teachers
 Helen Maria Chesnutt, among the earliest women of color in American classical education

Alumni

 Charles Francis Brush, inventor and industrialist
 Benjamin O. Davis Jr., first African-American to graduate from West Point since 1889. First African-American brigadier general in the USAF. Promoted to four-star general by President Bill Clinton.
 Harry Edward Davis, lawyer and Ohio state legislator 
 Russell Howard Davis, educator, activist, and historian. An alumnus, he returned to the school as its principal.
 John Patterson Greene, the "Father of Labor Day"
 Louis William Greeve, industrial designer and pioneer in the aerospace industry 
 Marcus A. Hanna, businessman and U.S. Senator. Served as Chairman of the Republican National Committee. 
 Langston Hughes, poet, social activist, novelist, playwright, and columnist 
 Helen Haiman Joseph, the "grandmother of American puppetry" because of her practical and scholarly knowledge of marionettes
 "Mickey" Katz,  American musician and comedian who specialized in Jewish humor
 Mary Brown Martin, the first African-American woman elected to the Cleveland, Ohio school board 
 Carman Sumner Newsome, African-American movie star, musician, and leader of a prominent jazz band
 Lila Pauline Robeson, international opera star and the first Cleveland-born artist to sing with the Metropolitan Opera in New York 
 John D. Rockefeller Sr., businessman and philanthropist.
 John L. Severance, industrialist and philanthropist 
 Noble Sissle, African-American composer, bandleader and vocalist 
 Thaddeus Spratlen, business school professor
 Louis Stokes, attorney, civil rights pioneer, and politician who served 15 terms in the US House of Representatives 
 Rachael Walker Turner, African-American soprano 
 Joseph Louis Weinberg, Architect who pioneered urban-renewal and slum clearance efforts 
 Adolph Weinberger, founder of Gray Drug Stores, Inc.

References

High schools in Cuyahoga County, Ohio
Defunct public high schools in Ohio
Education in Cleveland
1952 disestablishments in Ohio
1846 establishments in Ohio
Educational institutions disestablished in 1952
Educational institutions established in 1846
Central, Cleveland